{{DISPLAYTITLE:C11H16N2O3}}
C11H16N2O3 may refer to:

 Butalbital
 Enallylpropymal
 Nifenalol
 Talbutal
 Vinbarbital
 Vinylbital

Molecular formulas